The Agricultural University of Iceland is an educational and research institution focusing on agricultural and environmental sciences, founded in 2005. The university's main location is in Hvanneyri, near Borgarnes, Iceland, but it also operates research locations in Reykjavík (Kednaholt) and Hveragerði (Reykir).

Organization
 Faculty of Environmental Sciences
 Faculty of Land and Animal Resources
 Department of Vocational and Continuing Education

See also
 Skemman.is (digital library)

External links
 Icelandic website 

Universities in Iceland
Educational institutions established in 2005
2005 establishments in Iceland